The 2022 Surbiton Trophy was a professional tennis tournament played on outdoor grass. It was the 17th edition for men and 18th for women, which were respectively part of the 2022 ATP Challenger Tour and the 2022 ITF Women's World Tennis Tour. It took place in Surbiton, United Kingdom between 30 May and 5 June 2022.

Champions

Men's singles

  Jordan Thompson def.  Denis Kudla 7–5, 6–3.

Men's doubles

  Julian Cash /  Henry Patten def.  Aleksandr Nedovyesov /  Aisam-ul-Haq Qureshi 4–6, 6–3, [11–9].

Women's singles

  Alison Van Uytvanck def.  Arina Rodionova, 7–6(7–3), 6–2

Women's doubles

  Ingrid Neel /  Rosalie van der Hoek def.  Fernanda Contreras /  Catherine Harrison, 6–3, 6–3

Men's singles main draw entrants

Seeds

 1 Rankings are as of 23 May 2022.

Other entrants
The following players received wildcards into the singles main draw:
  Alastair Gray
  Paul Jubb
  Ryan Peniston

The following player received entry into the singles main draw using a protected ranking:
  Yūichi Sugita

The following players received entry into the singles main draw as alternates:
  Jay Clarke
  Mikhail Kukushkin

The following players received entry from the qualifying draw:
  Gijs Brouwer
  Billy Harris
  Pierre-Hugues Herbert
  Max Purcell
  Otto Virtanen
  Mark Whitehouse

The following players received entry as lucky losers:
  Marius Copil
  Ramkumar Ramanathan

Women's singles main draw entrants

Seeds

 1 Rankings are as of 23 May 2022.

Other entrants
The following players received wildcards into the singles main draw:
  Jodie Burrage
  Sarah Beth Grey
  Sonay Kartal
  Yuriko Miyazaki

The following player received entry into the singles main draw using a protected ranking:
  Yanina Wickmayer

The following players received entry from the qualifying draw:
  Jana Fett
  Isabelle Lacy
  Sabine Lisicki
  Alana Parnaby
  Urszula Radwańska
  Eden Silva
  Natalija Stevanović
  Lulu Sun

References

External links
 Official website
 2022 Surbiton Trophy at ITFtennis.com
 2022 Surbiton Trophy at ATPtour.com

Aegon Surbiton Trophy
2022 ATP Challenger Tour
2022 ITF Women's World Tennis Tour
2022 in English tennis
May 2022 sports events in the United Kingdom
June 2022 sports events in the United Kingdom
2022 sports events in London